Zhenru is a station on Line 11 and 14 on the Shanghai Metro. Line 11 opened on 31 December 2009. The station became an interchange station with the opening of Line 14, on 30 December 2021.

The station has 5 tracks, two island platforms, and one side platform. The inner island platform is not in service. Trains heading to either North Jiading or Huaqiao use the outer island platform, whilst trains towards Disney Resort use the side platform. This station utilizes the same platform layout as Nanxiang on the same line. The two platforms of Line 11 have interchange nodes with Line 14, and the node of the island platform also connects to the station hall of Line 14.

There are 5 exits to the station: two at Caoyang Road, and two at Tongchuan Road. The station is becoming increasingly busy.

Station Layout

References

Railway stations in Shanghai
Shanghai Metro stations in Putuo District
Line 11, Shanghai Metro
Line 14, Shanghai Metro
Railway stations in China opened in 2009